This article shows a list of cities and towns in Maldives. Administratively, only cities are recognized as being different from other islands, and no official towns exist. The islands are categorized into administrative atolls divided based on geographical location, with each atoll having a capital island.

List
Cities
 Addu City
 Fuvahmulah City - Capital of Gnaviyani Atoll
 Malé City - Capital of Maldives
 Kulhudhuffushi City - Capital of Haa Dhaalu Atoll

Atoll Capitals
 Rasdhoo - Alif Alif Atoll
 Mahibadhoo - Alif Dhall Atoll
 Eydhafushi - Baa Atoll
 Kudahuvadhoo - Dhaalu Atoll
 Nilandhoo - Faafu Atoll
 Villingili - Gaafu Alif Atoll
 Thinadhoo - Gaafu Dhaalu Atoll
 Dhihdhoo - Haa Alif Atoll
 Thulusdhoo - Kaafu Atoll
 Fonadhoo - Laamu Atoll
 Naifaru - Lhaviyani Atoll
 Muli - Meemu Atoll
 Manadhoo - Noonu Atoll
 Ungoofaaru - Raa Atoll
 Hithadhoo - Seenu Atoll
 Funadhoo - Shaviyani Atoll
 Veymandoo - Thaa Atoll
 Felidhoo - Vaavu Atoll

Other islands
 Dhidhdhoo
 Farukolhufunadhoo
 Gan
 Hinnavaru
 Hulhumalé
 Hulhumeedhoo
 Magoodhoo
 Maroshi
 Meedhoo
 Mulah
 Naifaru
 Nolhivaranfaru

References

External links

 
Maldives
Maldives
Towns
Maldives

simple:List of cities, towns and villages in the Maldives